David Handley (3 February 1932 – 9 March 2013) was a British cyclist. He competed in the tandem event at the 1960 Summer Olympics.

References

External links
 

1932 births
2013 deaths
British male cyclists
Olympic cyclists of Great Britain
Cyclists at the 1960 Summer Olympics
Sportspeople from Birmingham, West Midlands